Frederik Christian Kaas may refer to:
 Frederik Christian Kaas (1725–1803), Danish naval officer
 Frederik Christian Kaas (1727–1804), Danish naval officer